Pico Bonpland is Venezuela's third highest peak, at 4,883 metres above sea level. It is located in the Sierra Nevada de Merida, in the Venezuelan Andes of (Mérida State). The peak with its sister peak Pico Humboldt, and the surrounding páramos are protected by the Sierra Nevada National Park. The name of the peak is in honor of Aimé Bonpland, although he never visited the Venezuelan Andes.

The glaciers located in the Bonpland were the result from Merida glaciation in the Pleistocene. By 2011 they had all disappeared.

References

 Jahn A, Observaciones glaciológicas de los Andes venezolanos. Cult. Venez. 1925, 64:265-80

Bonpland
Glaciers of Venezuela
Geography of Mérida (state)
Páramos
Sierra Nevada National Park (Venezuela)